The initialism SNR may refer to:

 Signal-to-noise ratio
 Signal-to-noise ratio (imaging)
 Supernova remnant
 Society for Nautical Research
 Senior, a male generational title suffix
 Sanderstead railway station, London, National Rail station code